Revelation is a 1955 Italian-Spanish melodrama film written and directed by Mario Costa and starring May Britt, Francisco Rabal, Bernard Blier and Vera Carmi. It grossed 73.2 million lire at the Italian box office.

Plot 
A plane crashes into the sea, among the survivors a young atheist Russian journalist, Nadia Ulianova, traveling to investigate Catholicism in Italy, and a Catholic priest, Father Lorenzo. 

The news of the accident and the name of the people involved spark the curiosity of Elena, a lady of Russian origin, married to an Italian engineer, who has serious elements to think that Nadia is her younger sister. The woman manages to convince the survivor to move to Naples, to her home. From this moment the young Russian discovers a new reality: she rediscovers the affection of the family, the love for a young person and the faith in the Madonna.

Production 
The film, the result of a co-production with Spain, is part of the sentimental melodramas, commonly called tearjerking, very popular in that period among the Italian public, later renamed by critics with the term neorealism of appendix.

Cast 
  
May Britt as  Nadia Ulianova   
Francisco Rabal as  Sergio   
Bernard Blier as  Father Lorenzo  
Vera Carmi as  Elena   
 Julio Peña  as  Elena's husband      
Nino Manfredi as  Mario Giorgi 
 Augusto Pennella as Nandino
Ada Colangeli 
Miranda Campa 
 Cristina Grado

References

External links

Italian drama films
1955 drama films
1955 films
Films directed by Mario Costa
Films scored by Carlo Rustichelli
Spanish drama films
Spanish black-and-white films
Italian black-and-white films
1950s Italian films